Meliola is a large genus of fungi in the family Meliolaceae. It was circumscribed by Swedish mycologist Elias Magnus Fries in 1825.

Species
, Species Fungorum (in the Catalogue of Life) accepts 1701 species of Meliola, Outline of Fungi notes 1700 species. 
Species in the genus include:

Meliola brevispora
Meliola evansii
Meliola mangiferae
Meliola wainioi
Meliola zangii

See also List of Meliola species

References

Fungal plant pathogens and diseases
Meliolaceae
Taxa described in 1825
Taxa named by Elias Magnus Fries